The Dartmouth Natal Day Road Race is one of the longest running road races in North America. The event is part of the Natal Day festivities in the Halifax Regional Municipality.

History
The first Natal Day Road Race took place in 1907. Dartmouthian Chris Wolfe ran the Boston Marathon that year, finishing 23rd. This spurred the Natal Day committee to add a road race to the festivities for that year.

References

Sport in Dartmouth, Nova Scotia
Road running competitions
Track and field competitions in Canada
1907 establishments in Canada
Recurring sporting events established in 1907